William Harris Jr. (1884–1946) was a well-known Broadway theatrical producer.

Plays he produced included Abraham Lincoln, East is West, Twin Beds (1914), and Outward Bound.

He was the son of producer William Harris (Sr.), and younger brother of producer Henry B. Harris. Harris, who studied at Columbia University, was considerably younger than his brother. He was traveling and continuing his studies while his older brother became established in his theater work.

Harris assisted his sister-in-law in the management of his brother's business affairs, becoming a producer himself through this work.

References

External links

 

1884 births
1946 deaths
American theatre managers and producers